Aleko is the first of three completed operas by Sergei Rachmaninoff. The Russian libretto was written by Vladimir Nemirovich-Danchenko and is an adaptation of the 1827 poem The Gypsies by Alexander Pushkin. The opera was written in 1892 as a graduation work at the Moscow Conservatory, and it won the highest prizes from the conservatory judges that year. It was first performed in Moscow on 9 May 1893.

Performance history
The Bolshoi Theatre's premiere took place on 9 May (O.S. 27 April) 1893 in Moscow.

The composer conducted another performance in Kiev on 18/30 October 1893. (Tchaikovsky had attended the Moscow premiere of Aleko, and Rachmaninoff had intended to hear the premiere of Tchaikovsky's Pathétique Symphony on 16/28 October, but had to catch a train for Kiev to fulfill his Aleko conducting engagement.) A Pushkin centenary celebration performance on 27 May 1899 at the Tauride Palace in Saint Petersburg featured Feodor Chaliapin in the title role, and utilized the chorus and ballet of the Mariinsky Theatre.

The opera had its first performance in England on 15 July 1915 at the London Opera House under the direction of Vladimir Rosing.

The New York City Opera's 2016/17 season opened in Jazz at Lincoln Center's Rose Hall with a double bill of Aleko and Pagliacci, an opera that also premiered in May 1892. James Meena conducted and Stefan Szkafarowsky sang the title role.

Roles

Synopsis
A band of Gypsies has pitched its tents for the night on the bank of a river. Beneath a pale moon, they light campfires, prepare a meal and sing of the freedom of their nomadic existence. An old Gypsy tells a story. Long ago, he loved Mariula who deserted him for another man, leaving behind Zemfira, their daughter. Zemfira is now grown up, has her own child, and lives with Aleko, a Russian who has abandoned civilisation for the Gypsy life. Hearing this story, Aleko is outraged that Zemfira's father took no revenge on Mariula. But Zemfira disagrees. For her, as for her mother, love is free, and she herself has already tired of Aleko's possessiveness and now loves a younger Gypsy, one of her own people. After dances for the women and the men, the Gypsies settle down to sleep. Zemfira appears with her young lover, whom she kisses passionately before disappearing into her own tent to look after her child. Aleko enters and Zemfira taunts him, singing about her wild lover. Alone, Aleko broods on the catastrophe of his relationship with Zemfira and the failure of his attempt to flee the ordinary world. As dawn comes, he surprises Zemfira and her lover together. In a torment of jealousy he kills them both. All the Gypsies gather, disturbed by the noise. Led by Zemfira's father, they spare Aleko's life but cast him out from them forever.

Principal arias and numbers
Aleko's Cavatina / Каватина Алеко (Kavatina Aleko)
The Young Gypsy's Romance / Романс Молодого Цыгана (Romans Molodogo Tsygana)
The Old Gypsy's Story / Рассказ Старика (Rasskaz Starika)
Men's Dance / Пляска мужчин (Plyaska muzhchin)

Critical reception
Like Rachmaninov's two other operas, Aleko shows Rachmaninov finding his own individual style, independent of the traditional number opera or Wagner's music-dramas. Michael Bukinik, a contemporary of Rachmaninov at the conservatory, recalled the rehearsals for the opera:

I was a pupil of the orchestra class, and during the rehearsals, we not only admired, but were made happy and proud by his daring harmonies, and were ready to see in him a reformer.

Geoffrey Norris has noted criticism of the opera as lacking in dramatic momentum and the libretto as being a hastily crafted "hotchpotch". A contemporary critic in the Moskovskiye vedomosti wrote of the opera at the time of the premiere:

Of course there are faults, but they are far outweighed by merits, which lead one to expect much from this young composer in the future.

Recordings
1951 Ivan Ivanovich Petrov, Nina Pokrovskaya, Anatoly Orfenov, Alexander Ognivtzev, Bronislava Zlatogorova; Bolshoi Theatre Chorus and Orchestra; Nikolai Golovanov, Melodiya
1987 Evgeny Nesterenko, Svetlana Volkova, Vyacheslav Polozov, Vladimir Matorin, Raisa Kotova; USSR TV & Radio Large Chorus, Moscow Philharmonic Symphony Orchestra; Dmitri Kitaenko, Moscow Studio Archives / Alto   
1990 Arthur Eisen, Lyudmila Sergienko, Gegham Grigoryan, Gleb Nikolsky, Anna Volkova, Vasily Lanovoy; USSR Academic Grand Chorus of Radio & TV, USSR Academic Symphony Orchestra; Yevgeny Svetlanov, Melodiya
1993 Vladimir Matorin, Natalia Erassova, Viatcheslav Potchapski, Vitaly Tarastchenko, Galina Borissova; Russian State Choir, Bolshoi Theatre Orchestra; Andrei Chistiakov, Chant du Monde
1995 Samson Isoumov, Marina Lapina, Oleg Koulko, Leonid Tischenko; Aleko Choir, Donetsk Philharmonic Orchestra; Roman Kofman (Live Rotterdam), Verdi Records / Brilliant
1996 Nicola Ghiuselev, Blagovesta Karnabatlova, Pavel Kourchoumov, Dimiter Petkov, Tony Christova; Bulgarian Broadcasting Chorus, Plovdiv Philharmonic Orchestra; Rouslan Raichev, Capriccio
1997 Sergei Leiferkus, Maria Guleghina, Ilya Levinsky, Anatoli Kotscherga, Anne Sofie von Otter; Gothenburg Opera Chorus, Gothenburg Symphony Orchestra; Neeme Järvi, Deutsche Grammophon
2006 Egils Silins, Maria Gavrilova, Alexandra Dursuneva, Andrey Dunayev; Moscow Chamber Choir, RSO Moscow; Vladimir Fedoseyev, Relief
2007 Vassily Gerello, Olga Guryakova, Vsevolod Grivnov, Mikhail Kit; Yurlov Capella, Moscow Chamber Orchestra; Constantine Orbelian, Delos
2009. Sergey Murzaev, Svetla Vassileva, Evgeny Akimov, Gennady Bezzubenkov, Nadezhda Vasilieva; Coro del Teatro Regio di Torino, BBC Philharmonic; Gianandrea Noseda, Chandos
Notable excerpts
 1929 Feodor Chaliapin: Aleko's Cavatina. Available on LP, CD, online. Electrical (microphone) recording. A 1924 acoustical (horn) recording also exists.
Video
 1986 Evgeny Nesterenko (Aleko), Nelli Volshaninova/Svetlana Volkova (Zemfira), Sandor Semenov/Mikhail Muntyan (Young Gypsy), Vladimir Golovin/Vladimir Matorin (Old Gypsy), Maria Papazian/Raisa Kotova (Old Gypsy Woman); Gosteleradio Chorus, Moscow State Symphony Orchestra; Dmitri Kitaenko, VAI

References

Operas by Sergei Rachmaninoff
1893 operas
Russian-language operas
One-act operas
Operas based on works by Aleksandr Pushkin
Operas